Matlalxoch was an Aztec princess, the only daughter of Emperor Acamapichtli. She was a half-sister of Emperors Huitzilihuitl and Itzcoatl and half-aunt of Emperors Chimalpopoca and Moctezuma I. She is mentioned by Chimalpahin.

Sources 

Tenochca nobility
Nobility of the Americas